Lower Granite Lock and Dam is a concrete gravity run-of-the-river dam in the northwest United States. On the lower Snake River in southeastern Washington, it bridges Whitman and Garfield counties.

Lower Granite Dam is part of the Columbia River Basin system of dams, built and operated by the U.S. Army Corps of Engineers; power generated is distributed by the Bonneville Power Administration (BPA).

The first barge to Portland on the  navigation route was loaded with wheat and departed Lewiston on August 9, 1975.

Construction
Construction began in July 1965, but was halted less than two years later due to lack of funding. Work restarted in 1970, concrete was first poured in 1971, and the main structure and three generators were completed in 1975, with dedication ceremonies on June 19. An additional three generators were finished in May  bringing the generating capacity to 810 megawatts, with an overload capacity of 932 MW.

An  navigation lock was also included in construction.

Just downstream (northwest) of the dam on the east bank, Boyer Park was constructed by the Corps of Engineers and opened in April 1973.

Fishery

Lower Granite Dam is the most upstream dam in the Snake River system that has a fish ladder to allow adult salmon and steelhead to migrate upstream.  The Columbia River treaty tribes, along with some environmental groups, have recommended that this dam along with the other three lower Snake River dams be decommissioned and/or removed because of their impact on threatened and endangered chinook (threatened) and sockeye salmon (endangered) and steelhead (threatened) populations.,
The Corps of Engineers recognized in 1971 that the dam would have a detrimental impact on wildlife.

A significant increase in the sockeye salmon return to the Columbia River in 2008 proved a pleasant surprise and raised hopes for increased salmon runs across the Lower Granite.  Wildlife officials were not certain of the reason for the increased salmon return (Idaho Statesman, June 28, 2008). The Corps of Engineers has installed new devices, such as removable spillway weirs, in an attempt to make the dam less harmful to juvenile salmon.

There is also a juvenile bypass/collection facility that collects juvenile migrating salmon and steelhead so they can be transported downstream by barge.

Navigation lock
 Single-lift
 Width:  
 Length:

Asotin Dam
Authorized by Congress in 1962, a fifth dam on the lower Snake River was proposed several miles upstream (south) of Lewiston. Concerns over its environmental and recreational impact stalled the Asotin Dam project, and it was ultimately canceled in 1980. The Asotin County public utilities district attempted to revive the project in 1988, but it was quickly blocked by Congress, and a law banning future dams was signed into law by President Reagan on November 17.

Other proposed dams further upstream were not built either: the High Mountain Sheep Dam above the confluence with the Salmon River, and the Nez Perce Dam, just below it.

Road closed
Following the September 11 attacks in 2001, the road across the Lower Granite Dam was closed for over six years; it reopened for weekend traffic in May 2008. The sand dune area downstream on the south shore, accessed over the dam, was popular with local college students from Washington State University and the University of Idaho.

See also

List of dams in the Columbia River watershed
Ice Harbor Dam
Little Goose Dam
Lower Monumental Dam

References

External links 

 U.S. Army Corps Engineers: Lower Granite Dam
 Lower Granite Recreation
 Columbia River Inter-Tribal Fish Commission
 Fish Passage Center Dam Counts 
 History Link: Lower Granite Dam
 Boyer Park and Marina

Dams in Washington (state)
Buildings and structures in Garfield County, Washington
Hydroelectric power plants in Washington (state)
Buildings and structures in Whitman County, Washington
Run-of-the-river power stations
United States Army Corps of Engineers dams
Dams completed in 1984
Energy infrastructure completed in 1972
Energy infrastructure completed in 1979
Dams on the Snake River
Gravity dams
1975 establishments in Washington (state)
Dams with fish ladders